The Perris Union High School District is a school district serving Menifee and Perris, California. It is the only high school-only district in Riverside County.

The Perris Union High School District educates about 10,000 secondary and middle school students who live in the 2 rapidly growing cities and in surrounding rural areas in Menifee Valley and Perris Valley.

Schools
 California Military Institute
 Heritage High School
 Liberty High School
 Paloma Valley High School
 Pathways for Adult Life Skills
 Perris Community Adult School
 Perris High School
 Perris Lake High School
 Pinacate Middle School
 Scholar+Online Learning Academy

Feeder districts
 Menifee Union School District
 Nuview Union Elementary School District
 Perris Elementary School District
 Romoland Elementary School District

Local higher education facilities
 California Baptist University
 California State University, San Bernardino
 Mt. San Jacinto College (campuses in San Jacinto and Menifee)
 Riverside Community College (campuses located in Norco and Moreno Valley)
 University of California, Riverside

External links
 Official site

School districts in Riverside County, California
Menifee, California